Rodgers Rop (born 16 February 1976) is a long-distance runner from Kenya.

In 2002, Rop won both the Boston Marathon and the New York Marathon. He joined an exclusive club of men who have won both races: Bill Rodgers, Alberto Salazar, Ibrahim Hussein, Joseph Chebet, Meb Keflezighi, and Geoffrey Mutai (see also List of winners of the Boston Marathon and List of winners of the New York City Marathon).

Rop tried to defend his Boston and New York titles in 2003 but finished 7th and 2nd respectively. In 2006 he improved his personal best to 2:07:34, when he finished 6th at the London Marathon.

In 2007 he won the Hamburg Marathon in 2:07:32, one second ahead of Wilfred Kigen, setting again a personal best.

Like many other Kenyan athletes, Rop works as a police officer in the offseason. After winning Boston in 2002, Rop received not only the winner's $80,000 check but also gifts of five sheep and two cows from the people of his native village. He also named his newborn son "Boston".

Rogers Rop comes from Kapsabet, Kenya. He is married and has two children

Achievements

References

External links
 Rodgers Rop at World Marathon Majors
 Article of The Boston Globe from 2004
 Rodgers Rop in the half marathon in Rotterdam 2007

1976 births
Living people
People from Nandi County
Kenyan male long-distance runners
Boston Marathon male winners
New York City Marathon male winners
Kenyan male marathon runners